Curwen is an English surname. Notable people with the surname include:
 
Dame Anne Curwen (1889–1973), National General Secretary, YWCA of Great Britain
Annie Jessy Curwen (1845–1932), an author of books of instruction in music and piano playing
Sir Christopher Curwen (1929–2013), Head of the British Secret Intelligence Service from 1985 to 1989
Christopher Curwen (MP) (died 1450), English soldier, administrator and politician
Clarice Modeste-Curwen, a politician and educator from Grenada
Daisy Curwen (1889–1982), British swimmer
David Curwen (1913–2011), British miniature railway steam locomotive mechanical engineer
Henry Curwen (c.1581–1623), English politician
Hugh Curwen (died 1568), English ecclesiastic and statesman
John Curwen (1816–1880), English Congregationalist minister, and founder of the Tonic sol-fa system of music education
 Curwen Press, a music publishing house founded 1863 by John Curwen
John Curwen (physician)  (1821–1901), Superintendent of the first public mental hospital in Pennsylvania
Patric Curwen (1884–1949), British stage and film actor
Patricius Curwen (c. 1602 – 1664), English landowner and politician
Wilfred Curwen (1883–1915), English cricketer and soldier

See also
Corwin (disambiguation)
Curwin